The Eel Ground Band or Eel Ground First Nation is a Mi'kmaq First Nation band government of 977 people located on the Miramichi River in northern New Brunswick, Canada. The community comprises three reserves (Eel Ground #2, Big Hole Tract # 8 (south half), and Renous #12).

History

Eel Ground principally occupies lands adjoining the City of Miramichi, New Brunswick, and members of the two communities have no doubt interacted from the time of earliest European settlement.  About 1648, Nicolas Denys, Sieur de Fronsac, established a fort and trading post nearby, "on the North side of the Miramichi, at the forks of the river".  His son, Richard Denys, was placed in charge of the fort and trading post. In 1688 Richard describes the establishment as including about a dozen French and more than 500 Indians.

The band was officially recognised by the British in 1783, soon after the French defeat in the Seven Years' War.

No doubt the First Nation population had long preceded Denys' "establishment", and present-day inhabitants of Eel Ground would largely be descended from Richard Denys' immediate neighbours.  For the Mi'kmaq, the nearby junction of the Northwest and Main Southwest branches of the Miramichi River had long served as a natural meeting point.

Notable people

Thomas Barnaby - Chief (1888–94)

See also
List of communities in New Brunswick
List of First Nations in New Brunswick
 Eel Ground First Nation

References

Communities in Northumberland County, New Brunswick
Mi'kmaq governments
Mi'kmaq in Canada